The Chrysler 300 is a full-size car manufactured and marketed by Stellantis North America (and its predecessor companies) as a four-door sedan and station wagon in its first generation (model years 2005–2010) and solely as a four-door sedan in its second and current generation (model years 2011–present). 

The second generation 300 was marketed as the Chrysler 300C in the United Kingdom and Ireland and as the Lancia Thema in the remainder of Europe.

Background
The Chrysler 300 continues a tradition of large front engine, rear-wheel drive V8-powered luxury sedans the company has offered, starting in the 1940s with the Chrysler Saratoga and Chrysler New Yorker, followed by the Chrysler Windsor, Chrysler Newport and the Chrysler Cordoba, with the last rear wheel drive sedan, the Chrysler Fifth Avenue that ended production in 1989. 

When the company began operations in 1925, the Chrysler Six was entered as a roadster in the 1925 24 Hours of Le Mans where it finished the race, and in 1926, the Chrysler Imperial started the tradition of luxury and performance products. Starting in 1955, the Imperial became its own luxury brand and offered the Imperial Newport along with the Imperial Crown. The original Chrysler FirePower Hemi engine powered the Cunningham C-5R, a special racecar, and finished the 1952 Le Mans, 1953 Le Mans, and 1954 Le Mans endurance races, as well as the 1953 12 Hours of Sebring.

First generation (2005–2010)

The 300 debuted as a concept at the 2003 New York International Auto Show with styling by Ralph Gilles and production started in January 2004 for the 2005 model year. The Chrysler 300 was designed as a modern interpretation of the 1955 Chrysler C-300 (and the letter series Chryslers that followed), featuring a large grille, long hood and low roofline that was prominent on those vehicles. The styling retained many elements of the 1998 Chrysler Chronos concept car, such as chrome interior accents and tortoiseshell finishing on the steering wheel and shifter knob. It was the last Chrysler vehicle designed under Tom Gale, upon his retirement from DaimlerChrysler in December 2000. It shares a nameplate with the 1957 300C letter series coupe and convertible.

The Chrysler 300 is based on the rear-wheel drive Chrysler LX platform with Chrysler executives confirming that Chrysler engineers were sent to Germany to study the upcoming E-Class and as such, structural elements of the car's foundation such as the toe board, safety cage architecture, as well as the load-path philosophy ending up being derived from the design(s) utilized by then-partner, Mercedes-Benz. Mercedes executives also confirmed that several individual components of the car are derived from the Mercedes-Benz E-Class (W211) and S-Class of the era. Shared and or derived components from Mercedes-Benz included: the 3.0L OM642 turbo-diesel V6 used in overseas markets, the rear suspension cradle and 5-link independent rear suspension design derived from the E-Class, a double-wishbone front suspension design with short-and-long arm front suspension geometry derived from the Mercedes-Benz S-Class (W220). Components from the suspension such as the lower control arms were borrowed from the E55 AMG and have been verified by independent mechanics as being able to be interchangeable between both cars. Additionally, the 5-Speed NAG1 W5A580 transmission, rear differential, driveshaft, ESP & ABS systems, steering system, the CAN Bus electrical architecture, and cabin electronics including other electronic and engine modules were shared with the Mercedes-Benz components. Further, switchgear such as the cruise control and turn signal combination stalk, seat controls, seat frames, HVAC system(s), and the wiring harness were utilized from Mercedes-Benz components. Later model years also feature a Mercedes-Benz-derived laser key ignition system in place of the traditional metal key. The AWD models also benefited from the use of Mercedes-Benz's 4MATIC system, including transfer case components.

Model range

Base 
The basic 300 includes 17-inch wheels, wheel covers, four-wheel disc brakes, a single disc CD player, an auxiliary input jack, a power driver seat, and a 4-Speed (42RLE) automatic transmission. It uses a  EER V6 making . In Canada, it comes standard with the Touring model's  V6 engine. The vehicle comes with standard rear-wheel drive and available all-wheel drive. The basic 300 model was renamed to LX for 2008 and remains the code name for the platform.

Touring 
This model was renamed Touring Plus for the 2009 and 2010 model years.

Limited 
Additional features included 18-inch chrome-clad aluminum road wheels and anti-roll bars.

300C 

The top-of-the-line 300C version uses a 5.7 L (345 cu in) Hemi V8. Using the Multi-Displacement System (MDS), this engine can run on four cylinders when less power is needed to reduce total fuel consumption. The USEPA-rated fuel consumption of the 300C is:  city, and  highway. It uses a five-speed automatic transmission and comes standard with 18-inch chrome-clad alloy wheels, Chrysler's MyGIG Infotainment System in 2008 as well as Sirius Satellite Radio and Backseat Television in 2008. 

The Hemi cylinder heads necessitate the use of a double rocker arm shaft configuration, with a cam-in-block, overhead valve (OHV) pushrod design. There are two spark plugs per cylinder to promote efficient fuel/air mixture burn and thereby reduce emissions.

SRT-8 

The SRT8 can accelerate from 0–60 mph (97 km/h) in 4.9 seconds.

SRT Design 

In 2008 Chrysler began producing the SRT Design, which combined the 300c CRD engine with all the fully loaded refinements and sports setup of the SRT 8. This model was predominantly used in the European market.

Other variants

Station wagon 

Chrysler marketed the 300C in Europe, Australia, South America, the Middle East, and Japan as both a four-door notchback sedan and a five-door station wagon. The five-door station wagon was marketed as the 300C Touring (not to be confused with the North American notchback sedan's "Touring" trim level), which shared its sheet metal aft of the C-pillar and wheel designs with the Dodge Magnum. 

The base Chrysler 300 was not marketed in Europe. All cars came with the 300C body style/interior and a choice of either V6 diesel or V8 gasoline engines. The economical V6 diesel, sourced from Mercedes-Benz, was optional in Europe. All 300C Touring models, along with European 300C sedans and right-hand drive models were assembled by Magna Steyr in Graz, Austria beginning in June 2005. Steyr insisted on upgrading suspension components to suit European tastes. Dodge Charger/Magnum wheels with Chrysler center caps were used instead of the distinct wheels used on Canada-assembled models. The five-door station wagon body style was discontinued after the first generation.

Diesel (2006–2011)
It can accelerate from 0–60 mph (97 km/h) in 7.9 seconds while the top speed remains the same as the gasoline V6.

The 2008 UK models included the 300C SRT-Design model in sedan or Touring body, which included SRT 20-inch alloy wheels and wheel arch spats, chrome mesh grille, MyGIG satellite navigation, SRT-8 steering wheel, SRT-8 leather sports seats, and carbon fiber interior details.

ASC Helios 300 
ASC created a convertible version of the Chrysler 300C, dubbed the ASC Helios 300, and unveiled it at the North American International Auto Show in early 2005. Despite rumors, Chrysler confirmed that the vehicle would not be produced.

Executive Series 300 
The Walter P. Chrysler Executive Series 300 was an extended wheelbase version shown at the 2006 New York Auto Show. It added 6 inches (152 mm) to the rear passenger compartment.

Heritage Edition 300C
The Chrysler 300C Heritage Edition debuted in 2006 and was a performance-oriented trim that used the 5.7 Hemi and had styling cues from the Chrysler 300 "letter series" of the 1950s and the 1960s.

Beijing Auto T8 
The Beijing Auto T8 was a Chinese limousine version of the Chrysler 300, Beijing Auto produced two prototypes. The T8 got a new Cadillac-style nose and a new rear end; however, the rest of the design remained unchanged from the standard Chrysler 300. The only changes to the interior were a revised steering wheel with an updated logo. Beijing Auto did not have the right to continue to use the platform(s) or engine(s) necessary to produce the vehicle. Therefore, the continuation of the T8's development and production prospects came to an end in 2009.

Reception and legacy 
In regard to driving characteristics, the 300 was generally well-received. The ride of the car was described as "steady, comfortable, and a study in control" and it was stated that the car drove "a lot like a Benz" due to the heavy use of German engineering and involvement of Mercedes-Benz in the development process during Chrysler and Daimler's partnership. The car was also described as, "impressively stable at high speed," by journalists at speeds even in excess of 150+ MPH on German autobahns, on par with other German sedans of the era. Again, such attributes could be attributed to the car's German underpinnings. However, a real weakness in the car's driving experience was "numb steering," which many journalists claimed made the car feel "capable, but disconnected."

In the UK, the BBC's Top Gear team described the 300C as "something different with a bit of kitsch gangster cool". They praised the spacious and well-equipped interior, even calling it a "re-shelled German car with an American body," and the low price while criticizing the quality of certain materials, numb steering, and low engine torque of the V6 models.
 The first generation model was popular with British buyers who regarded it as the "poor man's Bentley".

In the US, the 300C enjoyed a wave of popularity in the mid-2000s, aided by celebrity owners (including US President Barack Obama,) and appearances in music videos. In 2004, rapper Snoop Dogg famously called then-Chrysler CEO, Dieter Zetsche, asking for his own 300C; he later appeared in a commercial for the car alongside Lee Iacocca. The 300C was ranked No. 12 in a Complex.com article, "The 25 Most Iconic Hip-Hop Cars", due to its popularity in many hip-hop music videos following its introduction. Chrysler 300 designer Ralph Gilles reflected on the vehicle's success in 2008, saying that the "300 turned out to be a bit of an icon for Chrysler".

Awards 
The 300C was the 2005 Motor Trend Car of the Year. It was on Car and Driver's Ten Best list for both 2005 and 2006. Automobile Magazine named it Automobile of the Year.

It also won the North American Car of the Year award. It was voted Canadian Car of the Year by automobile journalists as the Best New Luxury Car.

Receiving numerous other recognitions during its debut year, it was promoted as being one of the most awarded new cars ever. The 300C was also included in the finalists for 2005 World Car of the Year, but final points total put it in fifth place equal to the BMW 1-series.

Second generation (LD; 2011–present)

A redesigned 300 was introduced in 2011 as a four-door sedan. However, the core platform of the car, now called the 'LD' while updated, was still closely related to the original 'LX' platform. While the suspension was revised, the front suspension is still derived from the design of the Mercedes-Benz S-Class (W220) and the 5-link rear design from the Mercedes-Benz E-Class (W211).

Exterior design 

Exterior changes included revised sheet metal, thinner roof pillars, a more raked windshield, bi-xenon HID projector headlights, LED daytime running strips within the headlights, new taillights with LEDs and a horizontally slotted front grille with an updated version of the Chrysler winged brand emblem. Options included a dual-pane panoramic sunroof and 20-inch polished aluminum wheels.

Variants

The 2011 model was offered in Touring, Limited, 300C, and 300C AWD trim levels. Touring and Limited trims included the Pentastar V6, while the 300C line offered a standard 5.7 L Hemi.

A new 300C Executive Series luxury trim level was introduced alongside a new 300S trim at the 2011 New York International Auto Show. The sport-themed 300S featured black treatment for the grille and headlamps, 20-inch polished-face aluminum wheels with black painted pockets, 10-speaker Beats by Dr. Dre sound system, and steering wheel mounted paddle shifters. The Executive/Luxury Series was also sold in Europe, rebranded as the Lancia Thema from 2011 until 2014.

For the 2021 model year, the 300C and Limited trim levels were dropped, leaving the Touring, Touring L, and 300S, which included the previous year's Red S Appearance Package as standard.

SRT 

An SRT version was unveiled at the 2011 New York International Auto Show, featuring the 6.4 L 392 Hemi V8 engine.

The 6.4 L 392 Hemi engine is also used in other Chrysler Group SRT vehicles such as the Dodge Charger and Challenger.

In addition to the increase in power, the SRT receives specific exterior trim including a lower front fascia, large exhaust tips, body-color instead of chrome trim, and 20-inch (508 mm) aluminum wheels. The car also gets a lowered, sportier suspension setup and a large Brembo brake package.

The 300 SRT (or SRT8) was discontinued for the 2015 model year in the United States, but is still sold in Australia and the Middle East. Many Australian police departments use the 300 SRT as a patrol/pursuit vehicle. The 300 SRT was sold in left and right-hand drive abroad. After a decade of falling sales in Australia, production of right-hand-drive versions ended in 2021.

Powertrain 
A 3.0 L VM Motori V6 turbodiesel is also available in Europe, and Australia.

Beginning with the 2012 model year, all V6 models were equipped with the 8-speed 845RE Chrysler Torqueflite automatic transmission, licensed from ZF Friedrichshafen.

 Source for Lancia

Interior changes 

Interior changes included a revised instrument panel with localized "soft-touch" materials, 8.4-inch Uconnect Touch, a new steering wheel and center console, and standard leather seating on all trim levels. Both seat-mounted and curtain-side airbags were standard.

2015 facelift 

In late 2014, a facelift version of the 300 was introduced. This introduced new features such as:
 Full speed range Adaptive Cruise Control with Stop
 Full-Speed Forward Collision Warning (FCW) with Active Braking
 Lane Departure Warning with Lane Keep Assist
 Updated Uconnect Systems with Bluetooth and Voice Command
 7-inch electronic instrument cluster
 TorqueFlite eight-speed automatic transmission
 Restyled front and rear fascias
 New 3-spoke steering wheel design
 New black and silver mesh chrome grille

Marketing
As part of the 2011 Chrysler 300 advertising campaign, three TV commercials were produced. "Homecoming" featured Detroit Lions defensive lineman Ndamukong Suh driving through his rainy hometown of Portland, Oregon, in his new 2011 Chrysler 300, retracing his humble beginnings. "Attitude" featured John Varvatos seeking inspiration at a record store in Brooklyn taking a record under his arm and into his Chrysler 300. "Good Things" featured Dr. Dre driving through the streets of Los Angeles in a Beats by Dre equipped 2012 Chrysler 300.

The "See It Through"' TV commercial featured the Chrysler 300 and notable Detroit locals, including former Detroit Lion Ndamukong Suh and a poem written in 1917 by Edgar Guest titled "See It Through".

300S Turbine

At the Detroit Motor Show in 2013, Chrysler presented a 300S paying homage to the 1964 Chrysler Turbine. It was finished in two-tone bronze and black, with an over-chrome grille and a 22-inch wheel design reminiscent of the turbine motif.

Discontinuation
In 2022, Stellantis confirmed that the Chrysler 300 sedan will be discontinued after the 2023 model year due to poor sales and due to the company's plans to focus its future on electric vehicles rather than fossil fuel-powered vehicles. Stellantis will replace the Chrysler 300 with a Chrysler badged all-electric vehicle previewed by the Chrysler Airflow EV concept.

Production is expected to continue until December 2023 after which the facility will be retooled and fully modernized during 2024.

Safety

Euro NCAP
The Lancia version was safety tested by Euro NCAP in autumn 2011 with the following results:

IIHS
The 2022 Chrysler 300 was tested by the Insurance Institute for Highway Safety (IIHS):

Sales

Notes

References

External links 

 

300
Rear-wheel-drive vehicles
Police vehicles
Full-size vehicles
Sports sedans
Station wagons
2010s cars
Lancia vehicles
Cars introduced in 2004
Limousines
Euro NCAP executive cars